Isora may refer to:

 1374 Isora, an asteroid 
 Artemis Isora, in Greek Mythology
 Azumi-no-isora, a Japanese Deity
 Helicteres isora, or Indian screw tree
 Isora (beetle), a ladybird beetle genus

See also